Banco Chinchorro is an atoll reef lying off the southeast coast of the Municipality of Othón P. Blanco in Quintana Roo, Mexico, near Belize. It was featured throughout the 2009 semi-documentary film Alamar by Pedro González-Rubio.

Geography
The atoll has three islands, with an aggregate land area of :
Cayo Norte (actually two separate islets) (0.9 km²)
Cayo Centro (5.6 km²)
Cayo Lobos (southernmost) (0.2 km²)

There is an American crocodile reserve on the southernmost (and biggest) island. The islands (in common with many isolated tropical islands) are thickly populated with small crabs, which are tame and can be trodden on inadvertently by visitors.

Shipwrecks
The reef is home to at least nine shipwrecks, including two Spanish Galleons. The names of the known wrecked ships are: SS Caldera, SS Escasell, SS Far Star, SS Ginger Screw, SS Glen View, SS Penelopez, SS San Andreas, and SS Tropic. There is also a large ferry from Cozumel that washed up on Chinchorro during Hurricane Wilma.

References

External links

Ecosistema  Ayuntamiento de Othón P. Blanco

Biosphere reserves of Mexico
Atolls of Mexico
Islands of Quintana Roo
Underwater diving sites in Mexico
Protected areas of Quintana Roo
Ramsar sites in Mexico
Reefs of Mexico
World Heritage Tentative List for Mexico